Oleksandra Ryzhkova (born 9 July 1980) is a Ukrainian sprinter who specializes in the 400 metres.

In the 4 x 400 metres relay she competed at the 2003 World Championships and the 2004 Olympic Games without reaching the final.

Her personal best time was 51.75 seconds in the 400 metres, achieved in May 2005 in Kyiv.

References

1980 births
Living people
Ukrainian female sprinters
Athletes (track and field) at the 2004 Summer Olympics
Olympic athletes of Ukraine
Olympic female sprinters